is a Japanese superhero manga series written by Hideyuki Furuhashi and illustrated by Betten Court. It is both a spin-off and a prequel to Kōhei Horikoshi's manga series My Hero Academia. It was serialized in Shueisha's Jump GIGA in August 2016, but was transferred to Shueisha's online magazine, Shōnen Jump+, in October of the same year, with its chapters additionally collected into a total of fifteen tankōbon volumes which was completed as of July 2022.


Publication 

Written by Hideyuki Furuhashi and illustrated by Betten Court, My Hero Academia: Vigilantes began being published on Jump GIGA on August 20, 2016, but was transferred to Shōnen Jump+ after Jump GIGA ceased publication in October of that year. The series ended on May 28, 2022. Shueisha has collected its chapters into individual tankōbon volumes. The first volume was released on April 4, 2017. As of July 4, 2022, fifteen volumes have been released. The series is licensed for the English-language release in North America by Viz Media.

Reception 
In July 2018, Barnes & Noble listed My Hero Academia: Vigilantes on their list of "Our Favorite Manga of 2018". Anime News Network also listed My Hero Academia: Vigilantes among the six "Best New Manga for Kids/Teens".

In July 2019, Anime News Network listed My Hero Academia: Vigilantes on their list of "Underrated but Awesome Manga".

References

External links 

2016 manga
Comics spin-offs
My Hero Academia
Shueisha manga
Shōnen manga
Superheroes in anime and manga
Viz Media manga